The 2005–06 Danish Cup was the 52nd version of the Danish Cup. First round was played on about July 27 and the final was played on May 11. This was the first time in the tournament's modern history that the final was not played on the afternoon of the Ascension Day. This was because of a new deadline for domestic competitions, enforced by FIFA.

The cup winner, Randers FC, qualified for UEFA Cup qualification.

Fixtures and results
The team listed to the left, is the home team.

First round
In first round competed 48 teams from the "series" (Denmark's series and lower 2004) and 16 teams from Danish 2nd Division 2004-05.

Second round
In second round competed 32 winning teams from first round and 8 teams from Danish 1st Division 2004-05 (no. 9 to 16).

Third round
In third round competed 20 winning teams from second round, 6 teams from Danish 1st Division 2004-05 (no. 3 to 8) and 2 teams from Danish Superliga 2004-05 (no. 11 and 12).

Fourth round
In fourth round competed 14 winning teams from third round, 2 teams from Danish 1st Division 2004-05 (no. 1 and 2) and 4 teams from Danish Superliga 2004-05 (no. 7 to 10).

Fifth round
In fifth round competed 10 winning teams from fourth round and 6 teams from Danish Superliga 2004-05 (no. 1 to 6).

Quarter finals

Semi finals
The semi finals were played on home and away basis.

The draw took place on March 6, 2006.

Final

The final were played at Parken Stadium.

See also
 Danish Cup Final 2006
 Football in Denmark
 2005-06 in Danish football
 Danish Superliga 2005-06
 Danish 1st Division 2005-06
 Danish 2nd Division 2005-06 - East, West

References

External links
 The Danish FA's full match schedule.

Cup
Danish Cup
Danish Cup seasons